Nabaluia clemensii is an orchid endemic to Borneo.

References

External links 
The Internet Orchid Species Photo Encyclopedia

Coelogyninae